Honigmann or Honigman is a German surname meaning "honey-man". Notable people with the surname include:

Honigmann:
 Barbara Honigmann (born 1949), German author and artist
 E. A. J. Honigmann (1927–2011), German-born U.K. Shakespeare scholar and Fellow of the British Academy
 Friedrich Honigmann (1841–1913), German coal entrepreneur
 Heddy Honigmann (born 1951), Peruvian film director

Honigman:
 Jason L. Honigman (1904–1990), U.S. lawyer
 Steven S. Honigman (born 1948), U.S. lawyer

See also
 Honigman, Israeli fashion company
 Honigman Miller Schwartz and Cohn, a leading business law firm based in Michigan

German-language surnames
Jewish surnames